The knock-knock joke is a type of audience-participatory joke cycle, typically ending with a pun. Knock-knock jokes are primarily seen as children's jokes, though there are exceptions.

The scenario is of a person knocking on the front door to a house. The teller of the joke says, "Knock, knock!"; the recipient responds, "Who's there?" The teller gives a name (such as "Noah"), a description (such as "Police"), or something that purports to be a name (such as "Needle"). The other person then responds by asking the caller's surname ("Noah who?" / "Police who?" / "Needle who?"), to which the joke-teller delivers a pun involving the name (" place I can spend the night?" / " let me in—it's cold out here!" / " help with the groceries!").

The formula of the joke is usually followed strictly, though there are cases where it is subverted.

History
A possible source of the joke is William Shakespeare's Macbeth; first performed in 1606. In Act 2, Scene 3 the porter is very hungover from the previous night. During his monologue he uses "Knock, knock! Who's there" as a refrain while he is speaking:

Writing in the Oakland Tribune, Merely McEvoy recalled a style of joke from around 1900 where a person would ask a question such as "Do you know Arthur?", the unsuspecting listener responding with "Arthur who?" and the joke teller answering "!"

A variation of the format in the form of a children's game was described in 1929. In the game of Buff, a child with a stick thumps it on the ground, and the dialogue ensues:

In 1936, Bob Dunn authored the book Knock Knock: Featuring Enoch Knox, and he is regarded by some as having invented the modern knock-knock joke.

In 1936, the standard knock-knock joke format was used in a newspaper advertisement. That joke was:

A 1936 Associated Press newspaper article said that "What's This?" had given way to "Knock Knock!" as a favorite parlor game.  The article also said that "knock knock" seemed to be an outgrowth of making up sentences with difficult words, an old parlor favorite. A popular joke of 1936 (the year of Edward VIII's brief reign) was "Knock knock. Who's there? Edward Rex. Edward Rex who?  the Coronation." Fred Allen's 30 December 1936 radio broadcast included a humorous wrapup of the year's least important events, including a supposed interview with the man who "invented a negative craze" on 1 April: "Ramrod Dank... the first man to coin a Knock Knock."

The format is so well known that it can be changed to humorous effect. This is shown in this circa 1980 joke:

Other variations feature an Interrupting Pig, Interrupting Duck and other equally bothersome animals.

Popular culture
"Knock knock" was the catchphrase of music hall performer Wee Georgie Wood, who was recorded in 1936 saying it in a radio play, but he simply used the words as a reference to his surname and did not use it as part of the well-known joke formula. The format was well known in the UK and US in the 1950s and 1960s before falling out of favor.  It then enjoyed a renaissance after the jokes became a regular part of the badinage on Rowan & Martin's Laugh-In.

References

Joke cycles
Puns
Doors